Agua Dulce, Texas may refer to:
Agua Dulce, El Paso County, Texas
Agua Dulce, Nueces County, Texas